Plant Hill Arts College (formally Plant Hill High School) was an 11-16 community school, serving boys and girls predominantly from the suburb of Blackley,  Manchester. The school had approximately 820 pupils on roll before it was replaced by the Co-operative Academy of Manchester. The school was in close proximity to the M60 motorway affording it excellent links, by road, to a wide area. It was also well served by public transport.

Plant Hill as a Specialist Arts College

In September 2005 Plant Hill High School was awarded specialist status and became Plant Hill Arts College. This had a huge impact on student learning by enhancing the curriculum, with additional provision in
Performing Arts – music, drama, dance, media studies
Visual Art – fine art, 3D art, painting and drawing
Media Arts – ICT, E-media

Plant Hill becomes Co-operative Academy of Manchester 

Plant Hill Arts College, became the Co-operative Academy of Manchester as part of an overhaul of education in the city. Seven new academies in Manchester opened in September 2010 under the scheme. Plans for the Plant Hill site have been reveal as a 900-place high school and 120-place sixth form.
The part-private academy, backed by the Co-operative Group, will specialise in finance and business studies. New facilities on the Plant Hill Road site will be made available to the public for sports and adult education outside school hours.

see... The Co-operative Academy of Manchester

Exam results 

The number of students achieving 5 or more A* - C GCSE grades.

Percentage of pupils achieving 5+ A* - C

2002 18%
2003 28%
2004 31%
2005 35%
2006 23%
2007 24%
2008 32%
2009 17%
2010 42%

Ofsted Report

Former School facilities 

A purpose built sports hall
A music and drama suite
A swimming pool
5 MFL rooms
Learning support rooms for pupils with special needs
7 Science rooms
6 Technology rooms, including textile and food rooms
5 Humanities rooms
4 Computer rooms
Library and study centre
Careers base
Pastoral base
2 Visual Arts Rooms

Controversy

Truancy

It was one of two schools to register more than one in four pupils in this category with 26.5 per cent, The figures were revealed in a school performance league tables published which list the percentage of pupils persistently truanting for the first time.

Refusing to re-admit a former pupil

Plant Hill refusing to re-admit a former pupil who they claimed was too far behind in his GCSE studies to catch up. Council education bosses looked urgently at finding alternative tuition for the schoolboy 15, who had been sat at home for five months, despite insisting he wants to return to school. The LEA had ordered Plant Hill Arts College to admit the schoolboy after he was refused entry, but the school appealed to the Secretary of State Alan Johnson, who decided against forcing them to comply.

"Happy Slapping" attack

A schoolgirl of 16 years old was attacked in Blackley and was left unconscious in a vicious "happy slapping" attack on 9 May 2005. Footage of the attack was circulated on pupils' mobile phones.

The child's angry mother contacted national and local journalists in response to her daughter's attack. The child's mother commented that Plant Hill High had not taken tough action, even though the attack was a series of bullying incidents she had reported to the school. A request for an assembly to confiscate the mobile phones had been refused. At the time of going to national and local press, Plant Hill High School had refused to comment.

Notable former pupils 
 Hasney Aljofree, professional footballer, Oldham Athletic A.F.C. (2010–present)

References

External links
Plant Hill Arts College

1960s establishments in England
2010 disestablishments in England
Defunct schools in Manchester
Educational institutions disestablished in 2010
Educational institutions established in the 1960s